Ricardo Campos may refer to:
 Ricardo Campos (footballer, born 1985), Mozambican association football goalkeeper
 Ricardo Campos da Costa (born 1976), Brazilian association football midfielder
 Ricardo Campos (actor), Brazilian film actor
 Ricardo Campos (field hockey), represented Cuba at the 1980 Summer Olympics in field hockey
 Ricardo Campos (judoka), represented Brazil in judo at the 1975 Pan American Games
 Ricardo Campos, represented Brazil in the 1979 South American Youth Championships in Athletics
 Ricardo Campos, founded Wild Rags record label and store in California

Similar name
 Ricardo Campo (born 1969), Spanish alpine skier